The rusty-fronted tody-flycatcher (Poecilotriccus latirostris) is a species of bird in the family Tyrannidae, and one of twelve in the genus Poecilotriccus. It is found in Bolivia, Brazil, Colombia, Ecuador, and Peru. Its natural habitats are subtropical or tropical moist lowland forest and heavily degraded former forest.

References

rusty-fronted tody-flycatcher
Birds of the Amazon Basin
Birds of Brazil
rusty-fronted tody-flycatcher
Taxonomy articles created by Polbot